

Girls

Federal government colleges

Colleges administrated by the Pakistan military

Pakistan Army

Pakistan Navy

Pakistan Air Force

External links

Colleges
Karachi